Prof Alexander Mair OBE FRSE DPH (1912–1995) was a Scottish public health expert.

Life
He was born in Portknockie in northern Scotland on 9 September 1912, the son of local herring fisherman, Alexander Mair (1881–1941) and his wife, Jessie Slater. His father worked on the Zulu class trawler "Evangeline". He was educated locally and left school at the then normal UK age of 14. He worked in the fishing industry (the mainstay of the local community) but was an on-shore clerk overseeing catches in Buckie rather than being a fisherman.

Not until the onset of the Second World War was he inspired to study Medicine, joining Aberdeen University as a mature student in 1939 and graduating MB ChB in 1942. He then joined the Royal Army Medical Corps and was stationed first in Normandy in the aftermath of the D-Day landings and later in Brussels, rising to the rank of captain.

After the war he returned to academia gaining a Diploma in Public Health at Aberdeen then beginning lecturing in Public Health 1948. In 1952 he became Senior Lecturer in Public Health at St Andrews University and was given his Professorship in 1954.

He was elected a Fellow of the Royal Society of Edinburgh in 1980. His proposers were John McQueen Johnston, Anthony Elliot Ritchie, John Cameron, Lord Cameron, R. M. S. Smellie.

He retired in 1982 and died of a cardiac arrest in Broughty Ferry on 6 August 1995. He is buried with his parents at Portknockie.

Publications
Silicosis in Aberdeen Granite Workers
Sir James MacKenzie GP (1853–1925)

Family
He was married to Nancy Waddington and had three children.

References

1912 births
1995 deaths
Alumni of the University of Aberdeen
Academics of the University of Aberdeen
20th-century Scottish medical doctors
Fellows of the Royal Society of Edinburgh
Officers of the Order of the British Empire